Farouk al-Kaddoumi (alternative transliteration: Faruq al-Qaddumi; ; born 18 August 1931), also known by his kunya, Abu al-Lutf, was until 2009 Secretary-General and between 2004 and 2009 Chairman of Fatah's central committee and the Palestine Liberation Organization's political department, operating from Tunisia.

Early life
Farouk Kaddoumi was born on 18 August 1931 in the town of Jinsafut near Nablus and later his family moved to Jaffa in present-day Israel. During the 1948 Arab-Israeli War they fled to Nablus in the West Bank. For three years in the early 1950s he worked in Saudi Arabia for the Arab-American Petroleum Company (ARAMCO). In 1954 he moved to Egypt and while studying economy and political science at the American University in Cairo, he joined the Baath party.

Career with Fatah
In 1958, he joined Yasser Arafat and others in forming student groups calling for the liberation of Palestine. Finally, they formed Fatah (Palestinian National Liberation Movement) that was officially declared beginning of 1965. During the time, he was working for the ministry of health of Kuwait but in 1966 was expelled from the country for political activities connected with the PLO. By 1969 he became one of key figures in the PLO and after 1973 he headed its political department in Beirut, Lebanon.

In 1976, Arafat and Kaddoumi met with Meir Vilner and Tawfik Toubi, heads of Rakah (New Communist List), which had developed after the 1965 split in the Israeli Communist Party, and from which Hadash eventually developed. This meeting led to a close cooperation.

He has been living in Tunis since the early 1980s, where the PLO was based after it evacuated Lebanon. In 1985, he claimed that Leon Klinghoffer was pushed over the side of the Achille Lauro by his wife for the insurance money, when it was the four Palestine Liberation Front (PLF) hijackers of the Achille Lauro who singled out and murdered Klinghoffer, a Jew, after being refused permission by the Syrian government to dock at Tartus.

At the beginning of the 1973, he served as the head of the PLO's political department. After the Oslo accords in 1993, which he opposed as a betrayal of the PLO's principles, he refused to move to the Palestinian territories with the rest of the leadership to set up the Palestinian National Authority (PNA). From exile, he continued to advocate a hardline stance towards Israel, refused cooperation with the PNA and repeatedly embarrassed the PLO during negotiations with Israel by making statements denying the Jewish state's right to exist. This led to him being sidelined in Palestinian politics for over a decade, as the center of power moved to Gaza and then Ramallah.

PLO power struggle

Upon Arafat's death, Farouk Kaddoumi constitutionally succeeded him to the position of Fatah chairman. No new elections have been held since, and so he still occupies the post. Finding himself once again in a position of power, he began wrestling for control of the ideologically diverse movement, and of the PLO, pitted against PLO chairman and PNA president Mahmoud Abbas. Mud-slinging between the factions has been intense, with Kaddoumi trying to claim primacy for the PLO (which formally delegates power to the PNA). Among other things, Kaddoumi has denied that the PNA has a right to call its government members "ministers" or open embassies abroad. He also campaigns to come across as defender of the PLO vs. the PNA, and as a spokesman for the refugees, who like him remain in exile; both subjects stirring powerful sentiments in the Palestinian movement.

While most of the struggle has been carried out behind the scenes, the Palestinian Authority – then still in control of the Gaza Strip – suppressed an attempt by Kaddoumi to organize an armed militia outside of the Authority's control in the Strip. Kaddoumi responded by issuing a decree to expel all Fatah members who cooperated with the PNA, but this was declared unlawful by Fatah's central committee, as was Kaddoumi's styling himself "president of the movement".

As head of the PLO's political department, Kaddoumi has primary responsibility for foreign representation, however, PLO embassies were reorganized by Abbas and then PNA Prime Minister Salam Fayyad by removing Kaddoumi loyalists as ambassadors in PLO representations worldwide. Abbas has redirected foreign contacts to pass through the PNA's Minister of Foreign Affairs Nasser Al-Qidwa, and later Ziad Abu Amr and Riad Al-Maliki, which has infuriated Kaddoumi.

The 6th Fatah conference was held in Bethlehem in August 2009. Holding the conference in the occupied territories came as a disappointment to many exiled Fatah leaders who were unable to attend and who felt betrayed by this decision; Kaddoumi being one of those leaders. A few weeks before the conference, Kaddoumi accused Abbas of conspiring to kill Yasser Arafat and claimed that he has evidence for his involvement in a plot to poison Arafat. Abbas and his aides denied those allegations and accused Kaddoumi of inflaming fitna (divisions, internal strife).

While Abbas is undoubtedly the stronger player in this power struggle, members of the Abbas faction reportedly worry that Kaddoumi's militant attitude may eventually win over radical segments of the Fatah, or that he will ally with hardline forces outside the movement, such as the Hamas. Kaddoumi has repeatedly made official visits to the Asad regime in Damascus, where he was presented as representing the Palestinian movement in the Syrian press.

Quotes 
 "At this stage there will be two states. Many years from now there will be only one." (Farouk Kaddoumi),
 "Resistance is the path to arriving at a political settlement"
 "We shall never allow Israel to live in peace… We shall never recognize Israel, never accept the usurper, the colonialist, the imperialist."

References

1931 births
Living people
The American University in Cairo alumni
Fatah members
People from Jaffa
Palestinian refugees
Palestinian expatriates in Saudi Arabia
Palestinian expatriates in Egypt
Palestinian expatriates in Kuwait
Palestinian expatriates in Syria
Palestinian expatriates in Libya
Palestinian expatriates in Jordan
Palestinian people imprisoned by Jordan
Members of the Executive Committee of the Palestine Liberation Organization
Central Committee of Fatah members